Matter is an open-source connectivity standard for smart home and Internet of things devices, which aims to improve their compatibility and security.

The standard is royalty-free, though developers and manufacturers incur certification costs. It originated in December 2019 as the Project Connected Home over IP (CHIP) working group, founded by Amazon, Apple, Google and the Zigbee Alliance, now called the Connectivity Standards Alliance (CSA). Subsequent members include IKEA, Huawei, and Schneider. Version 1.0 of the specification was published on 4 October 2022. The Matter software development kit is open-source under the Apache License.

Matter-compatible software updates for many existing hubs became available in late 2022, with Matter-enabled devices and software updates

Background 
In December 2019, Amazon, Apple, Google, Samsung SmartThings and the Zigbee Alliance announced the collaboration and formation of the working group of Project Connected Home over IP. The goal of the project is to simplify development for smart home product brands and manufacturers while increasing the compatibility of the products for consumers.

The standard is based on Internet Protocol (IP) and works through one or several compatible border routers, avoiding the use of multiple proprietary hubs. Matter products run locally and do not rely on an internet connection, although the standard is designed to talk to the cloud easily. It is intended to enable cross-platform of smart home devices, mobile apps, and cloud services, and defines a specific set of IP-based networking technologies for device certification.

The project group is also expected to be joined by some other board member companies of Zigbee Alliance.

Versions 
Updates to the standard are planned to occur every six months, although the next version is expected to be published 18 months after the first version was published and include new features, devices, device types and certification methods.
 Version 1.0 of the specification was published on 4 October 2022. It introduced support for lighting products (such as mains power plugs, electric lights and switches), doorlocks, thermostats and heating, ventilation, and air conditioning controllers, blinds and shades, home security sensors (such as door, window and motion sensors), and televisions and streaming video players.
 , version 2.0 of the specification

Matter Casting 
This part of the technology concerns an open networking protocol for audio-video wireless casting from a sender device to a receiving display.

In Early 2023, no products are available, thus Amazon is working on implementing the receiver on some of its products such as FireOS televisions.

Supported devices 
The CSA maintains the official list of Matter certified products and restricts use of the Matter logo to certified devices. This list is available on the CSA's Certified Products Search. Matter product certification is also stored on the CSA's Distributed Compliance Ledger (DCL), a distributed cryptographically secure ledger hosted by the CSA and its members. The DCL is intended to allow the CSA, device manufacturers, and vendors to publish attestation information about certified devices.

See also 
 Constrained Application Protocol (CoAP)a service layer protocol that is intended for use in resource-constrained internet devices
 IEEE 802.15.4 is a technical standard which defines the operation of a low-rate wireless personal area network (LR-WPAN) which Matter battery-operated devices rely on such as
 Threadcompeting mesh network wireless protocol primarily designed for low-power battery-powered devices which Matter is partially based on
 Zigbeecompeting mesh network wireless protocol primarily designed for low-power battery-powered devices for home automation which Matter is also partially based on
 6LoWPANprotocol to make network packets small and simple enough for low-power battery-powered devices
 Z-Wavecomplementary wireless Sub-GHz mesh network protocol primarily designed for low-power battery-powered devices for home automation, smart security, and MDU
 Amazon AlexaSmart Home home control system
 HomeKitApple home control system
 WeaveGoogle
 SmartThingsSamsung Home control system
 Datagram Transport Layer Security (DTLS)
 OMA LWM2M
 MQTT
 KNX, example of a well known standard for cabled integration of home automation equipment
 ADRCXped Auto Discovery Resource Control

Further reading

References

External links 

 

Amazon (company)
Apple Inc.
Google
Comcast
Computer-related introductions in 2019
Home automation
Internet of things